Handessa is a village in Sri Lanka. It is located within Central Province in the Udunuwara electorate in the district of Kandy.

See also
List of towns in Central Province, Sri Lanka
Handessa school system was introduced by C. W. W. Kannangara.

References

External links

Populated places in Kandy District